Two ships of the Royal Navy have borne the name HMS Duke of York, after numerous holders of the title of Duke of York (or Duke of York and Albany):

  was a 4-gun cutter purchased in 1763 and sold in 1776
  was a  battleship launched in 1940, and broken up in 1958.  The original plan was to name her HMS Anson, but she was renamed prior to launch and the name was given to the next ship in her class instead.

Battle honours
Ships named Duke of York have earned the following battle honours:
Arctic, 1942−43
North Africa, 1942
North Cape, 1943

Note

See also

References

Bibliography
 
 

Royal Navy ship names